The Edmonton Alberta Temple is the 67th operating temple of the Church of Jesus Christ of Latter-day Saints (LDS Church), located in Edmonton, Alberta, Canada.

The temple was the second to be built in Alberta; the first was built in Cardston in 1923. The temple serves about 15,700 members in the area. The exterior of the temple is white granite and has a single spire topped by a statue of the angel Moroni.

History
The groundbreaking services were held on February 27, 1999, presided over by Yoshihiko Kikuchi. Before the dedication of the temple, a public open house was held. Approximately 40,000 people toured the temple during the weeklong open house.

LDS Church president Gordon B. Hinckley dedicated the temple on December 11–12, 1999.

In 2020, the Edmonton Alberta Temple was closed in response to the coronavirus pandemic.

See also

 Comparison of temples of The Church of Jesus Christ of Latter-day Saints
 List of temples of The Church of Jesus Christ of Latter-day Saints
 List of temples of The Church of Jesus Christ of Latter-day Saints by geographic region
 Temple architecture (Latter-day Saints)
 The Church of Jesus Christ of Latter-day Saints in Canada

References

Additional reading

External links
 
Edmonton Alberta Temple Official site
Edmonton Alberta Temple at ChurchofJesusChristTemples.org
 Construction and Renovation photos of the Edmonton Alberta Temple

20th-century Latter Day Saint temples
Religious buildings and structures in Edmonton
Temples (LDS Church) completed in 1999
Temples (LDS Church) in Alberta
1999 establishments in Alberta
20th-century religious buildings and structures in Canada